The 1912 United States cold wave was one of the coldest periods since 1870 in the Northern United States, according to the U.S. National Weather Service. The cold wave started in November 1911 and finally ended in March 1912, with periodic interruptions by milder temperatures.

November 1911–January 1912

The cold wave began in November 1911 when the  Great Blue Norther dropped temperatures abruptly.

January 1912 was the seventh-coldest January on record in the contiguous U.S. The states of Michigan, Wisconsin, and Minnesota had their coldest Januaries on record. Minneapolis/Saint Paul endured a record-setting 186 consecutive hours of below  temperatures, from 8 pm on December 31 until 1 pm on January 8. After only four hours above , the temperature again dropped below zero, this time for 121 consecutive hours, until 10 am on January 13.

After originating in the Arctic, this very cold air mass moved south. When it reached the northern U.S., much of the area experienced dangerous wind chills. The cold wave reportedly killed 47 Americans during its first two weeks. The cold was so severe that Niagara Falls froze over completely at one point, forming an ice bridge.

February–March 1912
February 1912 was less extreme. It was the 24th-coldest February on record for the contiguous U.S.

March 1912 was the second-coldest March on record for the contiguous U.S., with widespread heavy snowfalls. Williston, North Dakota had its coldest March on record from 1895 through 2017.

1912 climate

Aftermath
The United States Department of Agriculture reported that a freeze in late-December caused $6 million in damages ($ million today) to the California citrus industry. The department also claimed that its frost warnings prevented an additional $14 million in damages ($ million today).

These cold waves led to the first use of electric heaters and special sheds to protect against frosts and freezes.

References

External links
 Monthly Weather Review, 1912, NOAA.

United States Cold Wave, 1912
United States Cold Wave, 1912
cold
cold
1912